Out of the Loop is the debut album by American synthpop duo I Am the World Trade Center, released on July 17, 2001. Less than two months later, it gained some controversy after the September 11 attacks, due to both the band's name and the coincidental title of their 11th track, "September." The band was seen as gathering shameless attention out of the attacks when in actuality Out of the Loop was released prior to them.

Track listing
 "Metro [Brooklyn Mix]" – 3:16
 "Me to Be" – 2:42
 "Sounds So Crazy" – 2:58
 "Look Around You" – 3:04
 "Light Delay" – 3:01
 "Inside Your Head" – 3:21
 "Holland Tunnel" – 3:16
 "Flute Loops" – 2:14
 "Aurora Borealis" – 2:34
 "You Don't Even Know Her" – 2:39
 "September" – 3:31
 "Move On" – 2:29
 "Analogous" – 3:50
 "Metro [Athens Mix]" – 3:34

References

2001 debut albums